Kalu (also Romanized as Kalū) is a village in Daland Rural District, in the Central District of Ramian County, Golestan Province, Iran. At the 2006 census, its population was 700, in 162 families.

References 

Populated places in Ramian County